Shyamchi Aai (1953) is a Marathi film, directed by P.K.Atre. It is based on the book Shyamchi Aai written by Sane Guruji in Marathi. The film was acclaimed upon release. It stars Damuanna Joshi, Vanamala and Madhav Vaze. Shyamchi Aai won the Golden Lotus Award for Best Film at the National Film Awards in 1954.

Plot

The plot revolves around a boy called Shyam and his relationship with his mother. It shares the effect Shyam's mother has had on Shyam's life and upbringing, and how he is taught to stick to his ideals and principles, even in the face of poverty. The relationships of all the individuals in Shyam's family are explored. The film ends with the illness and sad death of Shyam's mother.

Cast
Damuanna Joshi	
Vanamala
Madhav Vaze
Arvind Rele

Awards
The film has won the following awards since its release:

1st National Film Awards (India)
 1953 - President's gold medal for the All India Best Feature Film

References

External links
 Obit to Vanamala(1915-2007)

1953 films
1953 drama films
1950s Marathi-language films
Best Feature Film National Film Award winners
Indian drama films
Indian black-and-white films